Korovin Volcano is one of four volcanic centers of the Atka Volcanic Complex, located near the town of Atka on the northeast part of Atka Island in the Aleutian Islands chain, Alaska, United States. At , Korovin is the highest point on the island.

Korovin is the most active of the four vents, but there have also been a couple historical eruptions attributed to nearby Kliuchef. Fumaroles and hydrothermal vents regularly steam from both peaks. The last confirmed eruption at Korovin was on June 30, 1998, although there were reports of later eruptions at the volcano in 2002, 2004 and 2005 which are considered questionable.

See also
 
List of mountain peaks of North America
List of mountain peaks of the United States
List of mountain peaks of Alaska
List of Aleutian Island volcanoes
List of Ultras of the United States
List of volcanoes in the United States

References

Sources
 
 
 Alaska Volcano Observatory

External links

 "Korovin Volcano, Alaska" on Peakbagger

Stratovolcanoes of the United States
Active volcanoes
Landforms of Aleutians West Census Area, Alaska
Mountains of Alaska
Volcanoes of Alaska
Mountains of Unorganized Borough, Alaska
Volcanoes of Unorganized Borough, Alaska